Eddy Bouwmans (born 30 January 1968) is a Dutch former road bicycle racer.  Bouwmans currently works as a Hospitality Coordinator for UCI WorldTeam .

Career
In 1989 at the Tour DuPont Bouwmans finished third in the opening time-trial less than four seconds behind the winner.
Bouwmans won the young rider classification in the 1992 Tour de France. He finished fourteenth in the Tour that year. In 1996 Bouwmans came ninth at the Tour of Austria.

Doping admission 
In 2013 Bouwmans admitted to having used testosterone and cortisone as a professional rider. He also admitted to have had three injections of EPO in 1994.

Major results
Sources:

1989
 1st Flèche Ardennaise
 3rd Ronde van Limburg
1990
 5th Overall Étoile de Bessèges
 5th Overall Vuelta a Asturias
 7th Overall Tour de Suisse
 7th Overall Vuelta a Burgos
 7th Overall Tour de l'Avenir
1991
 6th Overall Critérium du Dauphiné Libéré
 6th Overall Tour de Suisse
 9th Overall Tour of Britain
1992
 Tour de France
1st  young rider classification
1st Stage 4 (TTT)
 3rd Clásica de San Sebastián
 5th Overall Setmana Catalana de Ciclisme
 10th Overall Tour de Suisse
 10th Brabantse Pijl
1993
 1st Classique des Alpes
 1st Stage 4, Critérium du Dauphiné Libéré
 3rd Overall Vuelta a Murcia
 3rd Eschborn–Frankfurt
 4th Overall Tour de Suisse
 5th Arnhem–Veenendaal Classic
 7th Trophée des Grimpeurs
 9th Grand Prix d'Isbergues
1994
 1st Stage 1 Critérium International
 1st Stage 3 Tour du Limousin
 7th Japan Cup
1996
 2nd Trofeo Luis Puig
 2nd Seraing-Aachen-Seraing
 5th Grand Prix de Wallonie
 8th Overall Vuelta a Mallorca
 9th Overall Tour of Austria
1997
 1st  Overall ZLM Tour
 7th Overall Tour of Austria

References

External links

Palmares by cyclingbase.com

1968 births
Living people
Doping cases in cycling
Dutch sportspeople in doping cases
Dutch male cyclists
People from Laarbeek
Cyclists from North Brabant